Chashkino is a rural locality (a village) in Amzibashevsky Selsoviet, Kaltasinsky District, Bashkortostan, Russia. The population was 88 as of 2010. There are 3 streets.

Geography 
Chashkino is located 21 km northwest of Kaltasy (the district's administrative centre) by road. Amzibash is the nearest rural locality.

References 

Rural localities in Kaltasinsky District